Windsor Holden White (July 18, 1905 – 1976) was an American polo player.

Biography

Early life
White was born in Cuyahoga County, Ohio, the son of Windsor T. White and Delia Holden of Chagrin Falls, Ohio. He was a scion of the prominent White family of Ohio who made a fortune in the auto industry.

Polo
In 1941, he competed in the U.S. Open Polo Championship as part of the Westbury team, together with Gerald Dempsey, Earle Hopping and Stewart Iglehart. However, they lost to the Gulfstream team (John H. H. Phipps, Michael Grace Phipps, Charles Skiddy von Stade and Alan L. Corey, Jr.).

After he moved to England, he became a patron of the Polo Cottage team.

The Holden White Qualifying Matches at the Guards Polo Club are named in his honour. Moreover, the Holden White Cup at the Cowdray Park Polo Club at Cowdray Park, West Sussex is also named for him.

Personal life
He married Jean Stevenson Graves in New Jersey in 1930. During the Second World War, he was working in England with the U.S. Office of Censorship. He married secondly Jean Kathleen Mary Fielding, widow of Lt. Hugh Neville Clegg, and daughter of Sir Charles William Fielding (1863–1941; a descendant of the 3rd Earl of Denbigh) and Florence Dixon, on 12 July 1944. They resided at Polo Cottage in Midhurst, West Sussex, England. He died in Chichester in 1976.

References

1905 births
1976 deaths
Sportspeople from Ohio
People from Midhurst
American polo players
American emigrants to the United Kingdom
People from Chagrin Falls, Ohio
Date of death missing